Anzor Askerbiyevich Kunizhev (born 7 December 1975) is a former Russian professional football player.

Club career
He made his Russian Football National League debut for PFC Spartak Nalchik on 7 August 2000 in a game against FC Zhemchuzhina Sochi. He played 4 seasons in the FNL in his career.

External links
 

1975 births
Living people
Russian footballers
Association football forwards
PFC Spartak Nalchik players
FC Akhmat Grozny players
FC Volgar Astrakhan players
FC Yenisey Krasnoyarsk players
FC Lukhovitsy players
FC Mashuk-KMV Pyatigorsk players